Yamkela Ngam is a South African rugby union player who most recently played with the . His regular position is wing.

Career

He was included in the senior squad for the 2013 Vodacom Cup and made his debut for them against .

References

South African rugby union players
Eastern Province Elephants players
Living people
1991 births
Rugby union wings
Rugby union players from the Eastern Cape